Bellflower is a planned light rail station in the Los Angeles County Metro Rail system. It is part of the West Santa Ana Branch Transit Corridor project. Measure M funds are programmed for a scheduled completion in 2041, though the station may be constructed for an opening between 2033 and 2035.

The station is located across Bellflower Boulevard from the former Pacific Electric West Santa Ana Branch depot, built in 1927. Passenger services operated between 1905 and 1958; it served as the terminus of the line after 1950. Early maps use the former name of the town for the stop: Somerset.

References

Pacific Electric stations
Railway stations in Los Angeles County, California
History of Los Angeles County, California
Railway stations in the United States opened in 1905
Railway stations closed in 1958
Bellflower, California
Future Los Angeles Metro Rail stations
1905 establishments in California
Railway stations scheduled to open in 2033